Pedro Sousa was the defending champion but lost in the final to Andrej Martin.

Martin won the title after defeating Sousa 6–1, 6–2 in the final.

Seeds

Draw

Finals

Top half

Bottom half

References
Main Draw
Qualifying Draw

Svijany Open - Singles
2018 Singles